Derry Olympic Football Club was a football team from Derry, Ireland that was a member of the Irish League for the 1892–93 season. The team was selected from players in the County Londonderry area.

References

Association football clubs in Derry Urban Area
Defunct association football clubs in Northern Ireland
Association football clubs established in 1891
Association football clubs disestablished in 1893
Defunct Irish Football League clubs
1891 establishments in Ireland
1893 disestablishments in Ireland
Former senior Irish Football League clubs